Al-Rabadi is a sub-district located in Jiblah District, Ibb Governorate, Yemen. Al-Rabadi had a population of 16,462 according to the 2004 census.

References 

Sub-districts in Jiblah District